"Starship Mine" is the 144th episode of the American science fiction television series Star Trek: The Next Generation, the 18th episode of the sixth season. The episode features Tim Russ in a guest role, before he played the role of Tuvok on Star Trek: Voyager.

Set in the 24th century, the series follows the adventures of the Starfleet crew of the Federation starship Enterprise-D. In this episode, while the Enterprise is evacuated for maintenance, Captain Picard must, alone, contend with thieves posing as a work crew aboard the ship. The process is vaguely similar to ship degaussing but with a dangerous science fiction twist. The plot has been noted for its similarity to the 1988 action film Die Hard.

Plot
The Federation starship Enterprise is docked at the Remmler Array to be decontaminated through the use of a baryon sweep, harmless to the inorganic materials of the ship but deadly to living beings. The ship is evacuated to the array's base and its systems shut down in preparation for the sweep. Captain Picard and the rest of the senior staff are invited by the base's commanding officer, Commander Calvin Hutchinson, to a cocktail party, but Picard foresees that he will be cornered by Hutchinson's "small talk" during the event. He returns to the Enterprise to retrieve his riding saddle to go horse riding instead, but on leaving finds an array technician working with the ship's panels. Picard tries to find out what the technician is doing, but he is attacked instead; Picard gains the upper hand and knocks the technician out.

Meanwhile, at the cocktail party, Enterprise Chief Engineer La Forge detects strange readings coming from one of the centerpieces with his VISOR. Before he can investigate, the other array staff members take the partygoers as hostages, injuring La Forge and killing Hutchinson.  They prevent them from communicating with the rest of the crew or Starfleet while the sweep is initiated. The crew stealthily work to devise a plan to break free of their captors.

Aboard the Enterprise, Picard discovers that a small force of technicians, led by a woman named Kelsey, are aboard attempting to steal trilithium resin from the warp engines to sell to another group as part of a powerful explosive. He is captured but escapes. With the baryon sweep progressing forward through the ship, Picard plays a game of cat-and-mouse with the technicians while staying ahead. At one point, a terrible scream indicates that one of the technicians was caught in the baryon field. Eventually having neutralized all but Kelsey, Picard retreats to Ten-Forward, the last area that will be hit by the sweep. Kelsey manages to beam away to a waiting ship. Picard repeatedly hails the base to deactivate the baryon sweep. The Enterprise officers, having managed to overcome their captors by an elaborate ruse involving Geordi's VISOR, are able to stop the sweep just in time to save Picard's life. Data informs Picard of a shuttle trying to escape. Picard, having taken the control rod from the trilithium's storage container during his fight with Kelsey, states that they will not get far as the trilithium explodes, destroying the shuttle.

Casting
Tim Russ, as the rogue technician Devor, made his first appearance in the Star Trek franchise in "Starship Mine". He had previously been an alternate choice for the part of Geordi La Forge at the start of the series, but LeVar Burton was chosen instead by Gene Roddenberry. Russ subsequently auditioned on multiple occasions for parts in episodes, and was again considered for a main role in Star Trek: Deep Space Nine. Following his appearance in "Starship Mine", he appeared as a Klingon in the Deep Space Nine episode "Invasive Procedures" and as an unnamed Ensign in the film Star Trek Generations before landing the role of Tuvok in the main cast of Star Trek: Voyager.

David Spielberg is cast as party-host Hutchinson.

Reception
In 2011, TV/A.V. Club gave the episode a B rating, noting its action plot and focus on Picard, as he must reclaim his starship.

In 2012, Tor.com praised David Spielberg's performance as Hutchinson, especially the scene between Data (played by Brent Spiner) and Hutchinson. They also praised actress-stuntwoman Patricia Tallman for her presentation of Kiros. Overall they rated the episode 6 out 10, noting not just the Picard action sequences but also the many smaller lines of dialogue and details of the episode.

In 2012, Wired magazine said this was one of the best episodes of Star Trek: The Next Generation.

In 2017, Radio Times ranked "Starship Mine" the 3rd best episode of Star Trek for rookie trek watchers. The episode has been compared to the 1988 American action film "Die Hard".

In 2017, Popular Mechanics said that "Starship Mine" was one of the top ten most fun episodes of Star Trek: The Next Generation, noting that Captain Picard must save his ship as he races against the clock. In 2018, Popular Mechanics, highlighted "Starship Mine" as one of the 12 best Captain Picard episodes, and as recommended viewing for audiences to prepare for a new television series based on that character, Star Trek: Picard.

In 2018, Entertainment Weekly, ranked "Starship Mine" as one of the top ten moments of Jean-Luc Picard. In 2018, Tom's Guide rated "Starship Mine" one of the 15 best episodes featuring Picard.

In 2019, Den of Geek recommended rewatching this episode as background for Star Trek: Picard.

In 2020, Primetimer ranked this one of the top ten episodes for the character Jean-Luc Picard, the captain of the Enterprise 1701-D.

In 2020, Games Radar noted "Starship Mine" as key episode to watch before Star Trek: Picard, pointing out that Picard must thwart terrorists trying to make off with the Enterprise 1701-D's trilithium resin and calling it "Die Hard in Jefferies Tube" (referencing a 1980s action movie).

In 2020, Looper listed this one of the best episodes for Jean-Luc Picard.

Releases 
The episode was released as part of the Star Trek: The Next Generation season six DVD box set in the United States on December 3, 2002.  A remastered HD version was released on Blu-ray optical disc, on June 24, 2014.

An example of a broadcast television release was on April 4, 1993, when the episode aired at 5:30 PM, with the television guide noting that "Thieves posing as technicians trap Picard as lethal rays bombard the Enterprise."

References

External links

Star Trek: The Next Generation (season 6) episodes
1993 American television episodes
Television episodes directed by Cliff Bole